Mikael Ymer was the defending champion but chose not to defend his title.

Jiří Lehečka won the title after defeating Nicolás Kicker 5–7, 6–4, 6–3 in the final.

Seeds

Draw

Finals

Top half

Bottom half

References

External links
Main draw
Qualifying draw

Tampere Open - 1